Greater St. Louis is a bi-state metropolitan area that completely surrounds and includes the independent city of St. Louis, the principal city. It includes parts of both Missouri and Illinois. The city core is on the Mississippi Riverfront on the border with Illinois in the geographic center of the metro area. The Mississippi River bisects the metro area geographically between Illinois and Missouri; however, the Missouri portion is much more populous. St. Louis is the focus of the largest metro area in Missouri and the Illinois portion known as Metro East is the second largest metropolitan area in that state. St. Louis County is independent of the City of St. Louis and their two populations are generally tabulated separately.

The St. Louis, MO-IL metropolitan statistical area (MSA)—and the focus of this page—includes the City of St. Louis; the Illinois counties of Bond, Calhoun, Clinton, Jersey, Macoupin, Madison, Monroe, and St. Clair (known collectively as the Metro East); and the Missouri counties of Crawford (only the City of Sullivan), Franklin, Jefferson, Lincoln, St. Charles, St. Louis (separate from and not inclusive of the city of St. Louis), and Warren.

The larger St. Louis–St. Charles–Farmington, MO–IL combined statistical area (CSA) includes all of the aforementioned MSA, plus the Farmington, MO micropolitan statistical area, which includes St. Francois County, Missouri, and the Centralia, IL micropolitan statistical area, which includes Marion County, Illinois.

In 2020, the St. Louis MSA was the 21st-largest in the nation with a population of 2,820,253. The larger CSA is ranked 20th-largest in the United States, with a population of 2,909,003. Due to slow growth in the St. Louis area paired with comparatively rapid growth in the Sun Belt, the St. Louis MSA fell out of the top 20 largest MSAs in the United States in 2017 for the first time since 1840.

As of 2018, Greater St. Louis is home to the headquarters of ten of Missouri's eleven Fortune 500 companies, six Fortune 1,000 companies, and two of the top 30 largest private companies in America, as ranked by Forbes. The metropolitan area received the All-America City Award in 2008.

History

The Illini Confederacy at one time dominated the lands where St Louis is now located. During the 17th century, the population of indigenous peoples in the area was well over tens of thousands, with a population of 20,000 in the Grand Village of Illinois. Indigenous peoples in the area built earthwork mounds on both sides of the Mississippi River, with the Cahokia Mounds being the regional center. Due to mounds inside city limits, St Louis still has a nickname of “Mound City.”

Pierre Laclede Liguest and his 13 year old grandson, Auguste Chouteau, selected St. Louis as the site for a French fur trading post in 1764 due to its proximity to the Mississippi and Missouri Rivers, as well as its propensity to not flood. In 1770, St Louis ownership was transferred to Spain, and then returned to France during a secret treaty (Treaty of San Ildefonso), before becoming a part of the United States during the 1803 Louisiana Purchase.

St Louis steadily grew after the Louisiana Purchase due to the city being the starting point for Lewis and Clark and its access to water transportation. It was incorporated as a city in 1823. Between 1840 and 1860, the population exploded with immigrants, especially those of German and Irish descent. St Louis’s current boundaries were established in 1876. After the American Civil War, St Louis continued to grow into a major manufacturing center due to its access to rail and water transportation. By the 1890s, St Louis was the 4th largest city in the United States.

In 1904 St Louis hosted the world’s fair in Forest Park along with the Olympics at Washington University’s Francis Field. More than 20 million people visited the city during the fairs seven-month long run. St Louis was seen as a city of industrialization with ties to the automobile industry. The Great Migration between World War I and World War II brought thousands of African Americans to the city, boosting St Louis’s population to 800,000 by 1940. The population peaked in 1950 at 856,000, however there was no more room for expansion within city boundaries and earlier immigrant generations started moving to suburbs that could not be annexed.

During the mid 1960s the Gateway Arch and Busch Stadium started being built in part to help revitalize the central business district with a 30 year downtown building boom following. Today, there is a continued population decline, however, revitalization efforts are still well under way.

Political divisions in Greater St. Louis

Missouri

Crawford County MO: Sullivan
Franklin County MO: Berger, Gerald, New Haven, Pacific, St. Clair, Sullivan (partial), Union, Washington
 Jefferson County MO: Arnold, Barnhart, Byrnes Mill, Crystal City, De Soto, Festus, Herculaneum, Hillsboro, Imperial, Pevely
 Lincoln County MO: Elsberry, Moscow Mills, Old Monroe, Troy, Winfield
 St. Charles County MO: Cottleville, Dardenne Prairie, Defiance, Foristell, Flint Hill, Josephville, Lake St. Louis, New Melle, O'Fallon, Portage des Sioux, St. Charles, St. Paul, St. Peters, Weldon Spring, Weldon Spring Heights, Wentzville, West Alton
 St. Louis (Independent City): City of St. Louis
 St. Louis County MO: Ballwin, Bel-Nor, Bel-Ridge, Bella Villa, Bellefontaine Neighbors, Bellerive, Berkeley, Beverly Hills, Black Jack, Breckenridge Hills, Brentwood, Bridgeton, Calverton Park, Champ, Charlack, Chesterfield, Clarkson Valley, Clayton, Cool Valley, Country Club Hills, Country Life Acres, Crestwood, Creve Coeur, Crystal Lake Park, Dellwood, Des Peres, Edmundson, Ellisville, Eureka, Fenton, Ferguson, Flordell Hills, Florissant, Frontenac, Glen Echo Park, Glendale, Grantwood Village, Green Park, Greendale, Hanley Hills, Hazelwood, Hillsdale, Huntleigh, Kinloch, Kirkwood, Jennings, Ladue, Lakeshire, Manchester, Maplewood, Marlborough, Maryland Heights, Moline Acres, Normandy, Northwoods, Norwood Court, Oakland, Olivette, Overland, Pacific (partially), Pagedale, Pasadena Hills, Pasadena Park, Pine Lawn, Richmond Heights, Riverview, Rock Hill, St. Ann, St. John, Shrewsbury, Sunset Hills, Sycamore Hills, Town and Country, Twin Oaks, University City, Uplands Park, Valley Park, Velda City, Velda Village Hills, Vinita Park, Warson Woods, Webster Groves, Wellston, Westwood, Wilbur Park, Wildwood, Winchester, Woodson Terrace
 Warren County MO: Foristell, Marthasville, Truesdale, Warrenton, Wright City

Illinois
 Bond County IL: Donnellson, Greenville, Keyesport (partially), Mulberry Grove, Old Ripley, Panama, Pierron, Pocahontas, Smithboro, Sorento
 Calhoun County IL: Brussels, Hardin, Kampsville
 Clinton County IL: Albers, Aviston, Bartelso, Beckemeyer, Breese, Carlyle, Centralia (partial), Damiansville, Germantown, Hoffman, Huey, Keyesport (partially), New Baden, St. Rose, Shattuc, Trenton, Wamac (partially)
 Jersey County IL: Brighton (partially), Elsah, Fidelity, Fieldon, Grafton, Jerseyville, Otterville
 Macoupin County IL: Benld, Brighton (mostly), Bunker Hill, Carlinville, Chesterfield, Dorchester, East Gillespie, Gillespie, Girard, Mt. Olive, Medora, Modesto, Mount Clare, Nilwood, Royal Lakes, Sawyerville, Shipman, Staunton, Virden (partial), White City, Wilsonville
 Madison County IL: Alhambra, Alton, Bethalto, Collinsville (mostly), East Alton, Edwardsville, Godfrey, Glen Carbon, Granite City, Hamel, Hartford, Highland, Livingston, Madison, Marine, Maryville, New Douglas, Pontoon Beach, Roxana, South Roxana, St. Jacob, Troy, Venice, Wood River, Worden
 Monroe County IL: Columbia, Fults, Hecker, Maeystown, Valmeyer, Waterloo
 St. Clair County IL: Belleville, Brooklyn, Cahokia Heights, Caseyville, Collinsville (partially), Dupo, East Carondelet, East St. Louis, Fairmont City, Fairview Heights, Fayetteville, Freeburg, Lebanon, Lenzburg, Marissa, Mascoutah, Millstadt, New Athens, O'Fallon, Sauget, Shiloh, Smithton, St. Libory, Summerfield, Swansea, Washington Park

As noted above, the Greater St. Louis area includes two municipalities named O'Fallon (in St. Charles County, Missouri and St. Clair County, Illinois), two municipalities named Troy (in Lincoln County, Missouri and Madison County, Illinois), and two municipalities named Chesterfield (in St. Louis County, Missouri and Macoupin County, Illinois).

The nearby Hannibal–Quincy micropolitan area and Springfield, Illinois metropolitan area are technically not located within the metropolitan area, but are regionally associated due to their proximity and accessibility to Greater St. Louis.

Demographics
According to the 2010 United States Census, in Greater St. Louis there were 2,787,701 people living in 1,143,001 households, of which 748,892 households were families.

Race
In 2010, 98.2 percent of the population of Greater St. Louis considered themselves of one race, while 1.8 percent considered themselves of two or more races (e.g. biracial). Of those of one race, 2,214,298 residents or 76.9 percent of the population were white, 519,221 or 18 percent were African American, 60,316 or 2.1 percent were Asian American, and 32,542 residents or 1.1 percent were American Indian, Native Hawaiian, Pacific Islander American, or some other race. 72,797 residents or 2.5 percent were Hispanic or Latino Americans of any race.

Religion

According to a Pew Research study conducted in 2014, 75% of St. Louis metro area residents identify with Christianity and its various denominations, and 4% are adherents of non-Christian religions. 21% have no religion. Of those, about 3% specifically identify as atheists, about 3% identify as agnostics, and about 16% identify as "Nothing in particular".

The religious demographics of the St. Louis metro area are as follows:
Christianity 75%
Protestantism 47%
Evangelical Protestant 20%
Mainline Protestant 17%
Historically Black Protestant 10%
Catholicism 25%
Mormonism 2%
Other Christian 1%
Non-Christian Faiths 4%
Judaism 1%
Islam 1%
Hinduism 1%
Other religion 1%
Unaffiliated 21%

Age and gender
As of 2010, the median age for Greater St. Louis is 38.2, and 47.4 percent of the population was male while 52.6 percent of the population was female.

Income and housing statistics
As of 2010, Greater St. Louis included 1,264,680 housing units, and 90.4 percent or 1,143,001 units were occupied. Of those units that were vacant, 3.2 percent or 40,553 units were for rent, 1.6 percent or 19,956 were for sale, 1 percent or 12,575 were unoccupied seasonal homes, and .5 percent or 6,771 were sold or rented but unoccupied. 3.3 percent or 41,884 units were vacant and not for sale or rent. Of the occupied housing units, 70.6 percent or 807,431 were owner-occupied with 2,075,622 occupants. 29.4 percent or 335,570 units were rented with 739,749 occupants.

In 2010, the median income for a household in the St. Louis metro was $50,900.

Transportation

Transportation in Greater St. Louis includes road, rail, and air transportation modes connecting the communities in the area with national and international transportation networks. Parts of Greater St. Louis also support a public transportation network that includes bus, as well as the MetroLink light rail which began operating in 1993. The principal airport serving the region is St. Louis Lambert International Airport, located in St. Louis County. It also includes MidAmerica St. Louis Airport.

Education

Education in Greater St. Louis is provided by more than two dozen public school districts, independent private schools, parochial schools, and several public library systems. Greater St. Louis also is home to more than 30 colleges and universities.

Parks

Parks in Greater St. Louis are administered by a variety of state, county, and municipal authorities, and the region also includes the state of Missouri's only National Park, Gateway Arch National Park. Several Missouri state parks in the region and parks owned by St. Louis County are larger than 1,000 acres, while one park in the city of St. Louis, Forest Park, also exceeds 1,000 acres.

Economy

The 2014 Gross Metropolitan Product (GMP) of St. Louis was $145.958 billion, that makes St. Louis the 21st highest GMP in the United States. The three largest categories of employment in Greater St. Louis are trade, transportation, and utilities with 249,000 workers, education and healthcare services with 225,000 workers, and professional and business services with 185,000 workers. Greater St. Louis has more than 1.3 million non-farm workers, representing roughly 15 percent of the non-farm workforce of Missouri and Illinois combined. As of May 2011, 125,000 non-farm workers were unemployed in Greater St. Louis, with an unemployment rate of 8.6 percent. As of the third quarter of 2010, the Greater St. Louis region had more than 73,000 companies or establishments paying wages, while average weekly wages for that period were $833, slightly lower than the U.S. national average of $870.

The largest industry by business conducted was wholesaling with $71 billion, followed by manufacturing with $67 billion, retail trade with $36 billion, and healthcare with $16 billion. The area's largest employer by sector was healthcare with 174,000 workers, followed by retail trade with 152,000 workers and manufacturing with 134,000 workers. Using available data, the combined value of business conducted in the combined statistical area was $213 billion in 2007. With a gross metropolitan product of $112 billion in 2009, St. Louis' economy makes up 40% of the Gross State Product of Missouri.

Companies and major employers 
As of 2021, Greater St. Louis is home to eight of Missouri's ten Fortune 500 companies: Centene (#24), Emerson Electric (#181), Reinsurance Group of America (#207), Edward Jones (#295), Graybar (#399), Ameren (#469), Olin Corporation (#472), and Post Holdings (#474). In addition, the area is home to six Fortune 1,000 companies: Stifel (#633), Peabody Energy (#772), Energizer Holdings (#775), Caleres (#935), Belden (#964), Spire (#999). As well as two of the Top 50 Largest Private Companies in America, as ranked by Forbes: Enterprise Holdings (#9) and World Wide Technology (#20).

Other notable corporations from the area include Wells Fargo Advisors (formerly A.G. Edwards), Energizer Holdings, and Ralcorp. Significant healthcare and biotechnology institutions with operations in St. Louis include Pfizer, the Donald Danforth Plant Science Center, the Solae Company, Sigma-Aldrich, and Multidata Systems International.

Although it was purchased by Belgium-based InBev, Anheuser-Busch continues its presence in the city, as does Mallinckrodt Incorporated in spite of its purchase by Tyco International. General Motors continues to produce cars in the St. Louis area, although Chrysler closed its production facility in the region, which was located in Fenton, Missouri. Despite its purchase by Nestlé, Ralston Purina remained headquartered in St. Louis as a wholly owned subsidiary. St. Louis is also home to Boeing Phantom Works (formerly McDonnell-Douglas). In addition, the Federal Reserve Bank of St. Louis in downtown is one of two federal reserve banks in Missouri.

St. Louis County in particular is home to several area companies. Monsanto Company, formerly a chemical company and now a leader in genetically modified crops, is headquartered in Creve Coeur.  Express Scripts, a pharmaceutical benefits management firm, has its corporate headquarters in the suburbs of St. Louis, near the campus of the University of Missouri–St. Louis. Energizer Holdings, the battery company, is headquartered in Town and Country. Enterprise Rent-A-Car's headquarters are located in Clayton. Charter Communications was formerly headquartered in Town and Country, until the executive team moved to Stamford, Connecticut; however, Charter has continued to grow in St. Louis and has upwards of 4,000 employees in the region as of mid-2018. Emerson Electric's headquarters are located in Ferguson. Boeing Integrated Defense Systems is headquartered in Berkeley. Edward Jones Investments is headquartered in Des Peres. From 1994 until its acquisition in 2000 by Tyco International, another chemical company, Mallinckrodt, was headquartered in St. Louis County. Many of the former Mallinckrodt facilities are still in operation by Tyco in the St. Louis suburb of Hazelwood, Missouri. Others are SSM Health Care, Mercy Hospital, and the Tenet Healthcare Corporation chain.

Companies headquartered in Greater St. Louis

 Air Evac Lifeteam – (O'Fallon, Missouri)
 Alberici Corp. – (Overland, Missouri)
 Allsup – (Belleville, Illinois)
 Alton Steel – (Alton, Illinois)
 Amdocs – (Chesterfield, Missouri)
 Ameren – (St. Louis)
 American Railcar Industries – (St. Charles, Missouri)
 Anheuser-Busch InBev – (St. Louis)
 Answers.com – (University City, Missouri)
 Arch Coal – (Creve Coeur, Missouri)
 Ascension Health – (Edmundson, Missouri)
 Basler Electric – (Highland, Illinois)
 Bayer CropScience – (Creve Coeur, Missouri) [formerly Monsanto]
 Belden – (Clayton, Missouri)
 Bissingers – (St. Louis)
 BJC HealthCare – (St. Louis)
 Blazing Sun Inc. – (St. Louis)
 Bodine Aluminum, Inc. – (Troy, Missouri)
 Boeing Defense, Space & Security – (Berkeley, Missouri)
 Build-A-Bear Workshop – (Overland, Missouri)
 Bunge North America – (Chesterfield, Missouri)
 Caleres – (Clayton, Missouri) [formerly Brown Shoe Co.]
 Centene Corporation – (Clayton, Missouri)
 CitiMortgage – (O'Fallon, Missouri)
 Clayco, Inc. – (Overland, Missouri)
 Concordia Publishing House – (St. Louis)
 Daugherty Systems, Inc. – (Creve Coeur, Missouri)
 Dent Wizard – (St. Louis)
 Dierbergs – (Chesterfield, Missouri)
 Doe Run Company – (Maryland Heights, Missouri)
 Drury Hotels – (Creve Coeur, Missouri)
 Edgewell Personal Care – (Chesterfield, Missouri)
 Edward Jones – (Des Peres, Missouri)
 Emerson Electric Co. – (Ferguson, Missouri)
 Energizer Holdings – (Town and Country, Missouri)
 Equifax Workforce Solutions – (Maryland Heights, Missouri)
 Express Scripts – (Unincorporated north St. Louis County, Missouri)
 FleishmanHillard – (St. Louis)
 Glik's – (Granite City, Illinois)
 Graybar Electric Company – (Clayton, Missouri)
 HOK – (St. Louis)
 Hussmann Corp. – (Bridgeton, Missouri)
 Imo's Pizza – (St. Louis)
 Karmak, Inc. – (Carlinville, Illinois)
 The Korte Company – (Highland, Illinois)
 Luxco – (St. Louis)
 McCarthy Building Companies, Inc. – (Ladue, Missouri)
 McCormack Baron Salazar – (St. Louis)
 Mallinckrodt Pharmaceuticals – (Hazelwood, Missouri)
 MB Motorsports – (St. Louis)
 Maritz, LLC – (Fenton, Missouri)
 Mastercard - Global Operations Headquarters – (O'Fallon, Missouri)
 Mercy Health – (Chesterfield, Missouri)
 Metro East Industries – (Alorton, Illinois)
 MilliporeSigma – (St. Louis)
 MiTek – (Chesterfield, Missouri)
 Nestlé Purina PetCare – (St. Louis)
 Nidec Motor Corporation – (Ferguson, Missouri)
 Nike IHM – (Weldon Spring, Missouri)
 Novus International – (Weldon Spring, Missouri)
 Olin Corp. – (Clayton, Missouri)
 Panera Bread (St. Louis Bread Co.) – (Sunset Hills, Missouri)
 Peabody Energy – (St. Louis)
 PGAV – (St. Louis)
 Post Holdings – (Brentwood, Missouri)
 Prairie Farms Dairy – (Edwardsville, Illinois)
 Rabo AgriFinance – (Chesterfield, Missouri)
 Ralcorp – (St. Louis)
 Rawlings Sporting Goods – (Town and Country, Missouri)
 Reinsurance Group of America – (Chesterfield, Missouri)
 ReproMAX – (Chesterfield, Missouri)
 Roberts Broadcasting – (St. Louis)
 ROHO Group – (Belleville, Illinois)
 RoverTown – (St. Louis)
 Royal Canin USA – (St. Charles, Missouri)
 Save-A-Lot – (St. Ann, Missouri)
 Schnucks – (Maryland Heights, Missouri)
 Soft Surroundings – (Creve Coeur, Missouri)
 Spire Inc – (St. Louis) [formerly Laclede Group, Inc.]
 SSM Health – (Creve Coeur, Missouri)
 Stifel Nicolaus – (St. Louis)
 Suddenlink Communications – (Town and Country, Missouri)
 Tacony Corporation – (Fenton, Missouri)
 Test Drive Technologies (St. Louis)
 TricorBraun – (Creve Coeur, Missouri)
 True Manufacturing Company – (O'Fallon, Missouri) 
 Vi-Jon Laboratories  – (Overland, Missouri)
 Wells Fargo Advisors – (St. Louis) [formerly Wachovia Securities and prior to that A.G. Edwards]
 Wood River Refinery  – (Roxana, Illinois)
 World Wide Technology  – (Maryland Heights, Missouri)

Sports

The Greater St. Louis area is currently home to three professional sports teams: the St. Louis Blues (NHL) who won the Stanley Cup in 2019, and the St. Louis Cardinals (MLB), who have won 19 National League Pennants, and 11 World Series Championships and the St. Louis City SC (MLS).

See also
 St. Louis cuisine
 List of high schools in Greater St. Louis
 List of colleges and universities in Greater St. Louis
 Missouri census statistical areas
 
 :Category:People from St. Louis
 List of people from St. Louis

References

External links
 East-West Gateway Council of Governments
 St. Louis County Economic Council

 
Saint Louis
Saint Louis
Saint Louis
Saint Louis